Dan Abramovich, born  in Haifa, is a mathematician working in the fields of algebraic geometry and arithmetic geometry.  As of 2019, he holds the title of L. Herbert Ballou University Professor at Brown University, and he is an Elected Fellow of the American Mathematical Society.

Career
Abramovich received the bachelor's degree at Tel Aviv University in 1987 and completed the doctorate at Harvard University in 1991 under Joe Harris (Subvarieties of abelian varieties and of Jacobians of curves).  From 1991 to 1994 he was Moore Instructor at the Massachusetts Institute of Technology. Thereafter he held faculty positions at Boston University from 1994 to 1999 and since 2003 has been Professor at Brown University.

Among other topics, he has dealt with birational geometry, the resolution of singularities, subvarieties of Abelian varieties, limits for the torsion of elliptic curves, rational and integer points on algebraic varieties and moduli spaces of vector bundles on curves. Together with Felipe Voloch, in 1992 he succeeded in making progress toward proving the Mordell-Lang Conjecture in characteristic p (the full proof came later from Ehud Hrushovski). He has been a guest scholar at, among other institutions, the Hebrew University of Jerusalem, the Max Planck Institute for Mathematics in Bonn, the Mathematical Sciences Research Institute (MSRI), the Pierre and Marie Curie University in Paris and at IHES. He was an invited speaker at ICM 2018 (Resolution of singularities of complex algebraic varieties and their families). From 1996 to 1998 he was a Sloan Fellow. He is a Fellow of the American Mathematical Society.

Publications 
 
 
 
 
 
 with Voloch: Toward a proof of the Mordell-Lang conjecture in positive characteristic, Intern. Math. Research Notices, Band 5, 1992, S. 103–115

References

External links 
 Homepage
 Profile at Brown University

1963 births
Living people
Massachusetts Institute of Technology School of Science faculty
20th-century American mathematicians
21st-century Israeli mathematicians
Tel Aviv University alumni
Harvard Graduate School of Arts and Sciences alumni
Brown University faculty
Scientists from Haifa
Sloan Research Fellows
Algebraic geometers
21st-century American mathematicians
Israeli emigrants to the United States